Vasile Șoiman (born 10 August 1960) is a Romanian former football midfielder. After he retired from playing football, Șoiman worked as a police officer.

International career
Vasile Șoiman played three friendly matches at international level for Romania, making his debut under coach Valentin Stănescu, when he came as a substitute and replaced Zoltan Crișan in the 55th minute of a 2–1 loss against Bulgaria. His following two caps were a 2–2 against Poland and a 0–0 against Iraq, both under coach Mircea Lucescu.

Honours
Ceahlăul Piatra Neamț
Divizia B: 1992–93

References

1960 births
Living people
Romanian footballers
Romania international footballers
Association football midfielders
Liga I players
Liga II players
FCM Bacău players
CSM Ceahlăul Piatra Neamț players